The Tomb of Sheikh Yusof Sarvestani is a tomb complex composed of a decorative edifice erected in honor of Sheikh Yusof Sarvestani, astronomer, calligrapher and Philosopher located in Sarvestan, in Fars Province. It was built in the early 1314 AD in the age of Ilkhanate and uses mainly elements of Islamic architecture. The construction of the mausoleum as well as its aesthetic design is a reflection of the cultural, and geo-political status of Iran at the time.

Gallery

See also
 Sheikh Yusof Sarvestani
 Islamic architecture

External links

 Shiraz Municipality Website, article about the architecture of the tomb and its influences

References

Sarvestan
Sheikh Yusof
Buildings and structures in Fars Province